Maha Khalid ‘Issa Amer (born 27 March 1999) is an Egyptian diver. She competed in the women's three metre springboard event at the 2016 Summer Olympics.

References

External links
Arkansas bio

1999 births
Living people
Egyptian female divers
Olympic divers of Egypt
Divers at the 2016 Summer Olympics
21st-century Egyptian women